2010 Continental Championships may refer to:

African Championships
Athletics: 2010 African Championships in Athletics
 Football (soccer): 2010 Africa Cup of Nations
 Football (soccer): 2010 CAF Champions League
 Football (soccer): 2010 CAF Confederation Cup

Asian Championships
 Football (soccer): AFC Champions League 2010
 Multisport: 2010 Asian Games
 Multisport: 2010 Asian Beach Games

European Championships
 Aquatics: 2010 European Aquatics Championships
 Athletics: 2010 European Athletics Championships
 Darts: 2010 European Championship Darts
 Figure Skating: 2010 European Figure Skating Championships
 Fistball: 2010 European Men's Fistball Championship
 Football (soccer): 2009–10 UEFA Champions League
 Football (soccer): 2009–10 UEFA Europa League
 Football (soccer): 2010 UEFA European Under-17 Football Championship
 Football (soccer): UEFA Women's Champions League 2009–10
 Handball: 2010 European Men's Handball Championship
 Handball: 2010 European Women's Handball Championship
 Pitch and Putt: 2010 Pitch and putt European Championship
 Rhythmic Gymnastics: 2010 Rhythmic Gymnastics European Championships
 Taekwondo: 2010 European Taekwondo Championships
 Volleyball: Men's CEV Champions League 2009-10
 Volleyball: Women's CEV Champions League 2009-10
 Water Polo: 2010 Men's European Water Polo Championship
 Water Polo: 2010 Women's European Water Polo Championship
 Weightlifting: 2010 European Weightlifting Championships

Oceanian Championships
 Football (soccer): OFC Champions League 2009-10
 Swimming: 2010 Oceania Swimming Championships

Pan American Championships / North American Championships
 Football (soccer): CONCACAF Champions League 2009-10
 Football (soccer): 2010 CONCACAF Women's Gold Cup
 Judo: 2010 Pan American Judo Championships

South American Championships
 Football (soccer): 2010 Copa Libertadores
 Multisport: 2010 South American Games

See also
 Continental championship (disambiguation)
 2010 World Championships (disambiguation)
 2010 World Junior Championships (disambiguation)
 2010 World Cup (disambiguation)